Aftar is a village in Hafdar Rural District, in the Central District of Sorkheh County, Semnan Province, Iran. At the 2006 census, its population was 914, in 220 families.

References 

Populated places in Sorkheh County